Phycitodes gallicella is a species of snout moth which is endemic to France.

References

Moths described in 2002
Phycitini
Moths of Europe